Voracia is a genus of moths in the family Lasiocampidae. The genus was erected by Rudolf van Eecke in 1931.

Species
Voracia brechlini Zolotuhin & Witt, 2005
Voracia casuariniphaga van Eecke, 1931
Voracia nusa Zolotuhin & Witt, 2005

References

Lasiocampidae